The demographic characteristics of the population of Fiji are known through censuses, usually conducted in ten-year intervals, and has been analysed by statistical bureaus since the 1880s. The Fijian Bureau of Statistics (FBOS) has performed this task since 1996, the first enumerated Fiji census when an independent country. The 2017 census found that the permanent population of Fiji was 884,887, compared to 837,271 in the 2007 census. The population density at the time in 2007 was 45.8 inhabitants per square kilometre, and the overall life expectancy in Fiji was 67 years. Since the 1930s the population of Fiji has increased at a rate of 1.1% per year. Since the 1950s, Fiji's birth rate has continuously exceeded its death rate. The population is dominated by the 15–64 age segment. The median age of the population was 27.9, and the gender ratio of the total population was 1.03 males per 1 female.

Indigenous Fijians, the native inhabitants of Fiji, are a mixture of Polynesian and Melanesian, resulting from the original migrations to the South Pacific over time. The Indo-Fijian population increased rapidly from the 61,000 people brought from the Indian subcontinent (modern day India, Bangladesh, Pakistan) between 1879 and 1916 to work in the sugarcane fields, many who later would lease/own the sugar cane plantations.

In 1977 The Economist reported that ethnic Fijians were a minority of 255,000, in a total population of 600,000 of which fully half were of Indian descent, with the remainder Chinese, European and of mixed ancestry.

The native Fijians live throughout the country, while the Indo-Fijians reside primarily near the urban centres and in the cane-producing areas of the two main islands. Nearly all of the indigenous Fijians are Christian, with some two-thirds being Methodist. The Indo-Fijians, by contrast, have a similar religious mix as India today: some 76.7% percent of the Indo-Fijians are Hindu, with a further almost 16% being Muslim and 6 percent Christian. There are also a few Sikhs.

A national census is supposed to be conducted every ten years, but the census intended for 2006 was postponed until 2007. Finance Minister Ratu Jone Kubuabola announced on 27 October 2005 that the Cabinet had decided that it would not be in the country's interest to have a census and a general election in the same year. "Peoples’ focus on the elections could have an impact on their cooperation with census officials", he said. The Statistics Office supported Kubuabola's announcement, saying that public interest in the general election would likely distract people's attention from the census, making it problematic to conduct.

Ethnic groups 

According to the 2007 Census of Fiji, the number of Fijians increased from 393,575 to 475,739, while the number of Indians decreased from 338,818 to 313,798. According to government statistics, the latest estimated population of Indigenous Fijians is counted at 511,838, while there are 290,129 Indians and 56,071 Others (January 2012).

Religions (1996 census) 

† Includes atheists and agnostics.

Source: Fiji Statistics Department

As of the end of 2006 the LDS church reports 14,448 members in Fiji, which equal about 1.4% of the population. The LDS church also operates a temple in Fiji.

Births and deaths

CIA World Factbook demographic statistics 
The following demographic statistics are from the CIA World Factbook, unless otherwise indicated.
 Population: 827,900
 Age structure:
0–14 years: 33% (male 141,779; female 136,212)
15–64 years: 63% (male 263,127; female 262,686)
65 years and over: 4% (male 13,405; female 15,285) (2000 est.)
 Population growth rate: 0.67% (2015 est.)
 Birth rate: 19.43 births/1,000 population (2015 est.)
 Death rate: 6.04 deaths/1,000 population (2015 est.)
 Net migration rate: -6.75 migrant(s)/1,000 population (2015 est.)
 Sex ratio:at birth: 1.05 male(s)/female0–14 years: 1.05 male(s)/female15–24 years: 1.04 male(s)/female25–54 years: 1.05 male(s)/female55–64 years: 1.02 male(s)/female65 years and over: 0.85 male(s)/female
 Maternal mortality rate: 30 deaths/100,000 live births (2015 est.)
 Infant mortality rate:Total: 9.94 deaths/1,000 live birthsMale: 10.97 deaths/1,000 live birthsFemale: 8.87 deaths/1,000 live births (2015 est.)
 Total fertility rate: 2.47 children born/woman (2015 est.)
 Ethnic groups: iTaukei 56.8% (predominantly Melanesian with a Polynesian admixture), Indian 37.5%, Rotuman 1.2%, other 4.5% (European, part European, other Pacific Islander, Chinese)
 Languages: English (official), Fijian (official), Hindustani
 Religions: Protestantism 45% (Methodism 34.6%, Assembly of God 5.7%, Seventh-day Adventist 3.9%, and Anglicanism 0.8%), Hinduism 27.9%, other Christianity 10.4%, Roman Catholicism 9.1%, Islam 6.3%, Sikhism 0.3%, other 0.3%, none 0.8% (2007 est.)

References

Further reading 
 Bahadur, Gaiutra. Coolie Woman: The Odyssey of Indenture. The University of Chicago (2014)

External links 
 Fiji Government Website

 
Society of Fiji